Gymnadenia  borealis, the heath fragrant orchid, is a Palearctic orchid.
 
Gymnadenia  borealis is found in North and Central Europe (Great Britain, Ireland and Germany). The species can be found up to 2,800 meters in altitude.

References

 Anne Harrap and Simon Harrap, 2009 Orchids of Britain and Ireland: A Field and Site Guide A & C Black Publishers Ltd  2nd Revised edition  
 David Lang, 2004 Britain's Orchids  Princeton University Press 
 Pierre Delforge, 2006 Orchids of Europe, North Africa And the Middle East A & C Black Publishers Ltd/Timber Press

External links

borealis
Orchids of Europe
Flora of Great Britain
Plants described in 1997